The Special Intervention Detachment  is a police tactical unit of the Algerian Gendarmerie Nationale. It specializes in the fight against terrorism, the release of hostages and the close protection of high-ranking personalities. 

In 2013, it participated in the release of several people during the In Amenas hostage crisis.

History 
The DSI was created on August 27, 1989, by a presidential decree. It is elite unit of the Algerian gendarmerie. and the Algerian equivalent of the French GIGN.

It was established to confront the increase in crimes and criminals, especially in its mode of action, as it offers adapted intervention possibilities and additional tactical capacities.

Training

Recruitment 
The DSI recruits its future operators directly within the superior schools of the national gendarmerie for officers (the latter are selected before their graduation) and at the level of the schools of non-commissioned officers of the national gendarmerie of Sétif and Sidi Bel Abbès for non-commissioned officers.[4]

Induction training 
The students wishing to join the unit are first evaluated, if they pass this evaluation phase, they will be admitted to the integration program which has 4 phases :[4]

 The physical preparation program: (Military training, instruction in combat sports such as karate, boxing, unarmed combat, armed combat, martial arts in general...). They are supervised by professional instructors from the combat sports unit.
 The blocked training course of preparation: (Physical, psychological, and combat training) this phase is one of the most difficult because the trainee is put to hard test (day and night exercise, unfavorable climatic conditions...) and it ends with the famous psychological obstacle course.
 The qualification parachute jump: They go through the School of commando training and initiation to parachuting (EFCIP) of Boghar in order to pass their parachutist license, but also to be initiated to commando techniques and parachuting.
 The special intervention professional patent (BPSI): This is the final training to be operational within the unit, the trainees will receive courses in diving, combat first aid, training for dog handlers, but also shooting, use of explosives, close protection, and techniques of climbing buildings and reliefs, intervention in closed environment (Close Quarter Battle), open, etc...), are on the menu of these daily sessions. The training is carried out in 2 stages, the first is the phase of pedagogical instruction, and the second is the phase of restitution and evaluation of the trainees, they must pass the final test if they want to integrate the unit.

If they pass this test, they will be given the DSI pin and patch and will be admitted to the operational unit and become full-fledged operators of the unit.

The duration of training in DSI is 6 months, and trainees receive the equivalent of 1400 hours of advanced training.

Continuous training 
Nevertheless, the operators are in almost permanent training and each member follows a daily training. Shooting training is daily, with each element able to go to the shooting range whenever they wish. 

Shooting tests including timed, selective shooting, accuracy, long range, are evaluated by the training cell instructors. The training operations of different scenarios, always with live ammunition, are reviewed and debriefed to correct each action and try to improve its technicality. They also often train at night under night vision binoculars on all types of situations in the 13 sites reserved for them. exercises from a helicopter with recall techniques but also on fast driving and basic techniques in the field of negotiations and hostage taking.

DSI has trained a number of elite promotions from African countries in intervention and close protection.[4][5]

They exchanged with several foreign counterparts, among them the Austrian unit EKO COBRA, the Jordanian Special Operation Forces and the Jordanian Gendarmerie and the French GIGN. The DSI has provided many promotions from African countries; training in intervention and close protection.

The DSI has provided training in intervention and close protection to a number of elite promotions from African countries.

Missions 
The main tasks of the DSI are :
 The counterterrorism and the hostage rescue
 The neutralization of criminals or terrorists in various places (urban, forest, desert, mountain...)
 The participation of judiciary police operations 
 The escort and transfer of dangerous individuals
 Close protection and escort of VIP's

Organization 
The DSI is subdivided into several units, each with its own function, depending on the mission, they can work together in one operation or separately on their own.

The DSI is composed of :
 Intervention units: composed of assault groups, support groups, marksmans
 Operational support units: reconnaissance, observation, listening, jamming
 Combat swimmer units: amphibious assault, sabotage, reconnaissance, rescue, search
 Close protection and escort units: protection, security, VIP escort
 Artificer and deminer units : demining, break-in, technical assistance
 Cynophilia units: composed of cynotechnical groups, dog recruitment and training groups, drug or explosive search groups.
 Training unit: composed of a training and instruction cell, a sports office and a combat sports cell

Main tasks 
The DSI has carried out hundreds of operations since its creation, from the release of hostages to the arrest of forcible persons ("neutralization" in the unit's jargon). Some of the most well-known operations include the following:

Massive hostage crisis in In Amenas (Tiguentourine): On January 16, 2013, a column of four all-terrain vehicles, transporting about 30 heavily armed terrorists, crossed the Algerian-Libyan border, seized the gas complex of Tiguentourine, located 40 km from In Amenas, and took the 800 workers, including 130 foreigners, hostage. The special forces carried out the assault, which resulted in the elimination of 27 members of the terrorist commando, the arrest of three others and the death of 37 hostages.

Equipment 
The DSI, like all special forces in the world, has specific equipment for each intervention (helmets, tactical vests, bulletproof vests). The DSI operators are equipped with the latest generation of modern equipment.

Handguns 

 Glock 17 in 9 × 19 mm Parabellum, is the visibly most widely used handgun, used by Group divers because of its high water resistance. It is frequently equipped with an Insight Technology M3 LED or M6 tactical light with integrated laser. Modified version in the absence of a safety latch.
 Beretta 92 FS
 Caracal

Assault rifles 
 AKM
 AKMS
 AR-M4SF
 Steyr AUG
 HK-G36

Machine pistol 
 Beretta PM 12S
 HK MP7
 HK MP5

Machine guns 
 PKM
 RPK

Precision rifles 
 SVD Dragunov
 Remington MSR
 Zastava M93 Black Arrow
 Sako TRG 22

Shotgun 
 Franchi SPAS 12
 Beretta RS202M2

Other weapons 
 RPG-7
 X26 Taser
 Crossbow

Individual equipment 
 Spectra helmet, helmet with bulletproof visor
 Green Tactical combination, Ghillie suit (Support Sections and Snipers)
 Bullet-proof vest
 Ciras Vest
 Plate carrier vest
 Tactical vest
 Communication headset
 Kevlar gloves
 Night vision googles
 Balaclava
 Knee and elbow pads
 Holster
 Protective goggles

Vehicles

Terrestrial 

 Ford F-150 All Terrain Vehicle with Mobile Adjustable Ramp System (MARS)
 Gendarmerie Nissan Patrol All Terrain Vehicle
 Gendarmerie Toyota Land Cruiser All Terrain Vehicle
 Toyota Land cruiser civil armoured
 Nissan Patrol civil armoured
 Unmarked vehicles

Aerial 

 AS355N écureuil Helicopter of the National Gendarmerie
 Agusta-Westland AW-109 LUH Helicopter of the National Gendarmerie
 Mil Mi-17 Helicopter of the Algerian Air Force
 Aircraft of the Algerian Air Force

Pictures

References

Gendarmerie
Law enforcement in Algeria
Special forces of Algeria
Military units and formations established in 1989
1989 establishments in Algeria